Stephanie Kuehn is an American author of young adult fiction, best known for her William C. Morris Award-winning debut novel Charm & Strange, Delicate Monsters, and Complicit. Her novels often explore themes of mental illness and psychology.

Personal life 
Kuehn wanted to be a filmmaker as a teen and grew up in Berkeley, California. She grew up reading books by V.C. Andrews and Peter Straub.

Kuehn went to John F. Kennedy University and the University of California, Santa Cruz. She has a bachelor's degree in linguistics, a master's degree in sports psychology, and a doctorate in clinical psychology.

Her background as a psychologist is one of the reasons why many of her novels have narrators who are dealing with mental health issues.

She currently lives in Northern California with her husband and three children.

Selected works 
Her debut young adult novel, Charm & Strange, was published by St. Martin's Griffin in 2014 and tells the story of a teenage athlete who believes he might be a werewolf. Charm & Strange won the William C. Morris Award in 2014 and was nominated for a Carnegie Medal in 2014.

Delicate Monsters, her sophomore novel, about the intersecting lives of three troubled teenagers, was published in 2015 by St. Martin's Griffin. It won the Northern California Book Award in the category Children's Fiction for Older Readers in 2016.

Her third novel, Complicit, about a teen dealing with the aftermath of his sister burning down a barn and being sentenced to juvenile detention, was published by St. Martin's Griffin in 2016. Complicit was also on Booklist's 2014 Top 10 Crime Fiction for Youth, the 2015 Reading List of the Texas Library Association, YALSA's 2015 Top Ten Best Fiction for Young Adults list, and YALSA's 2017 Popular Paperbacks for Young Adults list. Complicit was also nominated for a Kentucky Bluegrass Award in 2016 and a Rhode Island Teen Book Award in 2016.

Kuehn's fourth novel, The Smaller Evil, is about a teen who arrives at a self-help center to deal with his anxiety and chronic illness, but stumbled into strange happenings when the retreat leader appears not to be who he seems. The Smaller Evil was published by Dutton in 2016. It received a starred review from School Library Journal Kuehn was awarded the PEN/Phyllis Naylor Working Writer Fellowship for The Smaller Evil in 2015.

Her fifth novel, When I Am Through With You, was published by Dutton in 2017. It received a starred review from Kirkus magazine.

Bibliography

Young adult novels 
Charm & Strange (St. Martin's Griffin, 2014)
Delicate Monsters (St. Martin's Griffin, 2015)
Complicit (St. Martin's Griffin, 2016)
The Smaller Evil (Dutton, 2016)
When I Am Through With You (Dutton, 2017)
We Weren't Looking to Be Found (Disney-Hyperion, 2022)

Short stories 
 in Feral Youth, edited by Shaun David Hutchinson (Simon Pulse, 2017)
 in (Don't) Call Me Crazy, edited by Kelly Jensen (Algonquin, 2018)
in His Hideous Heart, edited by Dahlia Adler (Flatiron, 2019)

Awards

References 

Living people
21st-century American novelists
Women writers of young adult literature
African-American novelists
Novelists from California
American children's writers
American women children's writers
21st-century American women writers
Year of birth missing (living people)
John F. Kennedy University alumni
University of California, Santa Cruz alumni
American women psychologists
21st-century American psychologists
American writers of young adult literature
African-American children's writers
African-American psychologists
American women novelists
21st-century African-American women writers
21st-century African-American writers
The William C. Morris YA Debut Award winners